Beta Ethniki 2005–06 complete season.

League table

Results

Top scorers

References

External links 
RSSSF.org

Second level Greek football league seasons
Greece
2